Peter Frampton is the eleventh studio album by English singer-songwriter Peter Frampton. Released in 1994, the album, along with three unreleased tracks from 1992's compilation album, Shine On - A Collection, were the artist's only studio releases of the 1990s. The album also features one of the last recordings made by Peter's former bandmate Steve Marriott on "Out of the Blue". An expanded version of the album was issued in 2000.

Track listing

All songs written by Peter Frampton and Kevin Savigar; except where noted. 
 "Day in the Sun" (4:27)
 "You Can Be Sure" (4:27)
 "It All Comes Down to You" (6:23)
 "You" (5:08)
 "Can't Take That Away" (Jonathan Cain, Peter Frampton) (5:50)
 "Young Island" (Peter Frampton) (1:39)
 "Off The Hook" (3:05)
 "Waiting For Your Love" (5:41)
 "So Hard to Believe" (John Regan, Peter Frampton) (5:14)
 "Out of the Blue" (Peter Frampton, Steve Marriott) (4:24)
 "Shelter Through The Night" (4:27)
 "Changing All The Time" (6:19)

2000 re-issue
 "You Can Be Sure" (Live Acoustic)*
 "Baby I Love Your Way" (Live Acoustic)* (Peter Frampton)
 "All I Want to Be (Is By Your Side)" (Live Acoustic)* (Peter Frampton)
 "Show Me the Way" (Live Acoustic)* (Peter Frampton)

 * Not included on the original ©1994 release, but included as a Bonus Track on the expanded ©2000 re-issue; all bonus tracks previously unreleased in the U.S.

The song "You Can Be Sure" received frequent airplay on some Anglo FM radios in Argentina.

Personnel
Peter Frampton - vocals, guitar, bass, keyboards
Lee Sklar, John Regan - bass
Kevin Savigar - keyboards; vocals on "So Hard to Believe"
Denny Fongheiser, John Robinson - drums
Steve Marriott - vocals on "Out of the Blue"
Jonathan Cain - electric piano on "Can't Take That Away"
Mixed by Chris Lord-Alge

References

1994 albums
Peter Frampton albums
Albums produced by Peter Frampton
Atlantic Records albums